United Nations Security Council resolution 1119, adopted unanimously on 14 July 1997, after recalling previous resolutions on Croatia including resolutions 779 (1992), 981 (1995), 1025 (1995), 1038 (1996), 1066 (1996) and 1093 (1997), the Council authorised the United Nations Mission of Observers in Prevlaka (UNMOP) to continue monitoring the demilitarisation in the Prevlaka peninsula area of Croatia until 15 January 1998.

The council was concerned that Croatia and the Federal Republic of Yugoslavia (Serbia and Montenegro) had failed to make progress in adopting practical suggestions proposed by the United Nations military observers in May 1996 in order to reduce tension and improve safety and security in the area in addition to resolving the Prevlaka dispute.

The parties were urged to fully implement an agreement on the normalisation of their relations, to refrain from violence, ensure freedom of movement to United Nations observers and remove land mines. The Secretary-General Kofi Annan was requested to report to the council on the situation by 5 January 1998 concerning progress towards a peaceful solution of the dispute between the two countries. Finally, the Stabilisation Force, authorised in Resolution 1088 (1996), were required to co-operate with UNMOP.

See also
 Breakup of Yugoslavia
 Croatian War of Independence
 List of United Nations Security Council Resolutions 1101 to 1200 (1997–1998)
 Yugoslav Wars

References

External links
 
Text of the Resolution at undocs.org

 1119
 1119
1997 in Yugoslavia
1997 in Croatia
 1119
July 1997 events